Robert Lawson (23 March 1901 – 28 November 1974) was an Australian cricketer. He played two first-class cricket matches for Victoria in 1931.

See also
 List of Victoria first-class cricketers

References

External links
 

1901 births
1974 deaths
Australian cricketers
Victoria cricketers
Cricketers from Melbourne